Hidemasa (written: 秀政, 秀匡 , 秀征 or 英正) is a masculine Japanese given name. Notable people with the name include:

, Japanese sumo wrestler
, Japanese samurai
, Japanese golfer
, Japanese footballer
, Japanese samurai
, Japanese samurai
, Japanese swimmer

Japanese masculine given names